Eremophila phillipsii is a flowering plant in the figwort family, Scrophulariaceae and is endemic to Western Australia. It is a tall, erect, open shrub, with narrow leaves and lilac to purple flowers which are white with purple spots inside. It often has an offensive smell.

Description
Its branches are often weeping and are glabrous, covered with small raised glands, sticky and often shiny.

The petal tube is lilac-coloured or purple on the outside, and white with purple spots on the inside. The outer surface of the petal tube and lobes is covered with glandular hairs, the inside of the lobes is glabrous and the inside of the tube is woolly. The 4 stamens are fully enclosed in the petal tube.

Taxonomy and naming 
The species was first formally described by Ferdinand von Mueller in 1893 and the description was published in Victorian Naturalist. The specific epithet (phillipsii) honours George Braithwaite Phillips.

Distribution and habitat
Eremophila phillipsii is found in rocky places, including at the base of granite outcrops, between Hyden and the Fitzgerald River in the Avon Wheatbelt, Esperance Plains and Mallee biogeographic regions.

Conservation
This species is classified as "not threatened" by the Western Australian Government Department of Parks and Wildlife.

Use in horticulture
This large shrub is very attractive in flower but it can give off a strong odour, so should be planted where this will not be a problem. It can be propagated from cuttings taken at any time of the year and grown in a wide range of soils, including heavy clay. It does best in full sun and is tolerant of both frost and long droughts but needs to be pruned from an early age to keep its shape compact.

References

Eudicots of Western Australia
phillipsii
Endemic flora of Western Australia
Plants described in 1893
Taxa named by Ferdinand von Mueller